Duan Liao (段遼) (died 339), also known as Duan Huliao (段護遼), was a Xianbei chieftain of the Duan tribe during the Sixteen Kingdoms period of China. He was the last chieftain of the Duan state before it was conquered in 338. Duan Liao launched a number of attacks against the Duke of Liaodong and later Prince of Former Yan, Murong Huang after civil war erupted between Huang and his brother, Murong Ren. Duan Liao met with repeated failures, and in 338, Murong Huang and Shi Hu of Later Zhao formed an alliance for a joint campaign against the Duans which resulted in the destruction of their state. Duan Liao surrendered to Murong Huang, but later rebelled and was killed in 339. Although the Duan tribe's state was destroyed, they remained an important family throughout the period through their marriages with the Murongs.

Life

Becoming chieftain 
Duan Liao was the grandson of Duan Rilujuan, the accredited founder of the Duan tribe. In 325, his cousin, Duan Ya, became the tribe’s new chieftain. The Duke of Liaodong, Murong Hui, quickly established friendly relations with Duan Ya, even managing to convince Duan Ya to move his capital away from Lingzhi (令支, in present-day Qian'an, Hebei). The decision proved unpopular among his subjects, however, and Duan Liao would use this as pretext to rally the tribes under the Duan clan to overthrow Duan Ya. Duan Ya died in the same year he ascended, and Duan Liao was installed as the new chieftain.

At the time of Duan Liao's coup, the Duan tribe had a territory that stretched from Yuyang Commandery to the Liao River. Sometime between 329 and 335, Duan Liao was made Grand General of Chariots and Cavalry, Inspector of Youzhou, Grand Chanyu, and Duke of Beiping by the Jin dynasty (266–420) court. In 331, he was made General of Agile Cavalry.

War with Murong Huang 
Murong Hui died in 333 and was succeeded by his heir, Murong Huang. Huang was not on good terms with his three brothers, Murong Ren, Murong Han and Murong Zhao (慕容昭). Right after Huang’s succession, Murong Han, concerned for his safety, fled with his two sons to Duan Liao. Duan Liao appreciated Han’s talents and welcomed him. Not long after, Murong Zhao and Murong Ren rebelled against Huang. Although Zhao was killed early on, Ren was able to capture Liaodong and consolidate an independent base. Duan Liao, along with other Xianbei chieftains such as Yuwen Yidougui of the Yuwen tribe, sent envoys to Ren to coordinate attacks against Huang.

Duan Liao first acted against Huang in 334. He sent soldiers to surprise attack Tuhe (徒河; in present-day Chaoyang, Liaoning), but failed. Then, Duan Liao sent his brother, Duan Lan, and Murong Han to attack Liucheng (柳城; southwest of present-day Chaoyang, Liaoning). The defenders fought back fiercely, so the two generals retreated after some fighting. Duan Liao was angry at Duan Lan for this. After reprimanding him, he forced Duan Lan to return to Liucheng and capture it at all costs. Duan Lan was once more unsuccessful, but he was able to rout reinforcements led by Murong Han (慕容汗; different character from Murong Han (慕容翰)) and Feng Yi at Niuwei Valley (牛尾谷; north of Liucheng). However, he could not follow up on it as Murong Han (慕容翰) turned back in protest against pursuing them.

In June 336, Duan Liao’s general Li Yong (李詠) attempted to surprise attack Murong Huang but was captured instead. After this, Duan Liao sent Duan Lan to attack Liucheng again. This time, he was supported by Yuwen Yidougui, who helped him by attacking Anjin (安晉). However, the two fled without a fight after Huang arrived at their respective locations and were defeated by Feng Yi who pursued them. Disgruntled, Duan Liao personally commanded an attack on Liucheng, but was routed in an ambush set up by Feng Yi at Mount Madou (馬兜山), where his general, Rong Bobao (榮伯保) was killed in battle. That same year, Murong Huang's son, Murong Jun, successfully led campaigns against Duan Liao's cities.

In March 337, Murong Huang built Haocheng (好城) east of Duan Liao's territory at Yilian (乙連; in present-day Jianchang County, Liaoning) to put pressure on Yilian. The following month, Duan Liao delivered grain carts to supply Yilian to relief a famine, but they were captured by Huang's general Lan Bo (蘭勃). Duan Liao ordered his cousin, Duan Quyun (段屈雲) to launch a night raid at Xingguo (興國; in present-day Harqin Zuoyi Mongol Autonomous County, Liaoning), but Quyun was defeated by Murong Zun (慕容遵). Duan Liao's minister, Yang Yu advised Duan Liao to seek peace with Murong Huang, but Duan Liao refused and sent him away.

Anti-Duan alliance 
Up to this point, Duan Liao had ordered a number of raids on the borders of Later Zhao. In 337, Murong Huang, now the Prince of Former Yan, declared himself a vassal of Zhao and call for a joint campaign against the Duan tribe. Zhao's ruler, Shi Hu, was delighted by his submission, and secretly fixed a date with him to hold their campaign.

The campaign began in February 338. Shi Hu had recruited 30,000 brave men in preparation for the campaign. Duan Liao attacked Zhao first by sending Duan Quyun to raid Zhao in Youzhou, where Quyun drove the provincial inspector, Li Meng (李孟) out to Yijing. Shi Hu sent Tao Bao and Wang Hua (王華) with 100,000 men on boats to advance from Piaoyu Crossing (漂渝津; northeast of Gaocheng District, Hebei) and another 70,000 men under Zhi Xiong and Yao Yizhong to attack Duan Liao.

Meanwhile, Murong Huang attacked the cities north of Lingzhi. Duan Liao wanted to pursue them, but Murong Han told him that they should focus on Zhao in the south. Duan Lan angrily rebuked, believing this to be another ruse of his to mislead the Duans. Duan Lan led the entire army out to face Huang, but they were ambushed and was met with heavy casualty. 5,000 households as well as tens of thousands of livestock was moved from the Duan territory to Yan.

Shi Hu camped at Jintai (金台; in present-day Gu'an County, Hebei) while Zhi Xiong made a long march to Ji. Zhi Xiong captured forty cities and received surrenders from Duan officials in Yuyang, Shanggu and Dai Commandery along the way. With Duan Lan defeated and most of his cities captured, Duan Liao and his followers abandoned Lingzhi and fled to Mount Miyun (密雲山; in present-day Miyun District, Beijing). Before parting ways, Duan Liao expressed his regret to Murong Han over not following his advice earlier. While Duan Liao left for Mount Miyun, Murong Han fled to the Yuwen tribe up north.

Duan Liao's chief clerks, most notably Liu Qun, Lu Shen, and Cui Yue (崔悅), all surrendered and offered their services to Zhao. On his way to Mount Miyun, Duan Liao was pursued by the Zhao generals, Guo Tai (郭太) and Ma Qiu, who captured Duan Liao's wife and mother and killed 3,000 of his followers during the chase. Duan Liao had to escape alone on horseback to the rough terrains. There, he sent his son and a prized steed to Shi Hu to show his submission, which Shi Hu accepted.

Surrender to Former Yan and death 
Duan Liao remained at Mount Miyun for a few months. While there, Shi Hu turned on Murong Huang and attacked him at Jicheng (棘城, in modern Jinzhou, Liaoning), albeit with little success. At the end of the year, Duan Liao dispatched envoys to Zhao requesting their assistance. However, he later regretted this decision and asked Yan for help instead. As a result, both Zhao and Yan were heading towards one another to receive Duan Liao. Murong Huang led the army and was first to arrive at Mount Miyun. Once there, Duan Liao and Huang discussed their plans on how to deal with the Zhao army. Huang sent his son, Murong Ke to lay an ambush around Mount Miyun. The Xianbei allies defeated Ma Qiu at Sanzangkou (三藏口, in present-day Chengde, Hebei), killing many of the Zhao soldiers in the process and capturing Yang Yu. Huang assimilated Duan Liao's troops into his and treated the chieftain with great respect.

Despite this, just a year later in 339, Duan Liao rebelled against the state for unspecified reasons. Murong Huang had him and his partisans killed, and later sent his head to Zhao. Although they had lost their state, the Duan clan remained influential under the Murongs and even in Later Zhao. A number of women in the clan married into the Murongs, becoming princesses and empresses, while Duan Liao's brother, Duan Lan became a military general in Zhao. Lan's son, Duan Kan, would establish the short-lived state of Duan Qi in 350 during the confusion that followed Shi Hu's death.

References 

 Fang, Xuanling (ed.) (648). Book of Jin (Jin Shu).
 Sima, Guang (1084). Zizhi Tongjian.
 Wei, Shou (554). Book of Wei (Wei Shu).

Jin dynasty (266–420) generals
339 deaths
Executed Sixteen Kingdoms people
Duan tribe